The Curiate Assembly (comitia curiata) was the principal assembly that evolved in shape and form over the course of the Roman Kingdom until the Comitia Centuriata organized by Servius Tullius. During these first decades, the people of Rome were organized into thirty units called "Curiae". The Curiae were ethnic in nature, and thus were organized on the basis of the early Roman family, or, more specifically, on the basis of the thirty original patrician (aristocratic) clans. The Curiae formed an assembly for legislative, electoral, and judicial purposes. The Curiate Assembly passed laws, elected Consuls (the only elected magistrates at the time), and tried judicial cases. Consuls always presided over the assembly. While plebeians (commoners) could participate in this assembly, only the patricians (the Roman aristocrats) could vote.

Since the Romans used a form of direct democracy, citizens, and not elected representatives, voted before each assembly. As such, the citizen-electors had no power, other than the power to cast a vote. Each assembly was presided over by a single Roman Magistrate, and as such, it was the presiding magistrate who made all decisions on matters of procedure and legality. Ultimately, the presiding magistrate's power over the assembly was nearly absolute. The only check on that power came in the form of vetoes handed down by other magistrates, and decisions made by presiding magistrates could also be vetoed by higher-ranking magistrates. In addition, after 493 BC, any decision made by a presiding magistrate, including one concerning the Curiate Assembly, could be vetoed by a magistrate known as a plebeian tribune (aka. tribune of the plebs).

Procedure
In the Roman system of direct democracy, primary types of gatherings were used to vote on legislative, electoral, and judicial matters. The first was the Assembly (comitia, literally "going together" or "meeting place"). The Curiate Assembly was a comitia. Assemblies represented all citizens, even if they excluded the plebs like the Curiate Assembly did, and were used for official purposes, such as for the enactment of statutes. Acts of an Assembly applied to all Roman citizens. The second type of gathering was the Council (concilium), which was a forum where a specific class of citizen met. In contrast, the Convention (conventio, literally "coming together") was an unofficial forum for communication. Conventions were simply forums where Romans met for specific unofficial purposes, such as, for example, to hear a political speech. Private citizens who did not hold political office could only speak before a Convention, and not before an Assembly or a Council. Conventions were simply meetings, and no legal or legislative decisions could be made in them. Voters always assembled first into Conventions to hear debates and conduct other business before voting, and then into Assemblies or Councils to vote.

A notice always had to be given several days before the Assembly was to vote. For elections, at least three market-days (often more than seventeen actual days) had to pass between the announcement of the election, and the actual election. During this time period (the trinundinum), the candidates interacted with the electorate, and no legislation could be proposed or voted upon. In 98 BC, a statute was passed (the lex Caecilia Didia) which required a similar three market-day interval to pass between the proposal of a statute and the vote on that statute. During criminal trials, the assembly's presiding magistrate had to give a notice (diem dicere) to the accused person on the first day of the investigation (anquisito). At the end of each day, the magistrate had to give another notice to the accused person (diem prodicere), which informed him of the status of the investigation. After the investigation was complete, a three market-day interval had to elapse before a final vote could be taken with respect to conviction or acquittal.

Only one assembly could operate at any given point in time, and any session already underway could be dissolved if a magistrate "called away" (avocare) the electors. In addition to the presiding magistrate, several additional magistrates were often present to act as assistants. They were available to help resolve procedural disputes, and to provide a mechanism through which electors could appeal decisions of the presiding magistrate. There were also religious officials (known as Augurs) either in attendance or on-call, who would be available to help interpret any signs from the gods (omens), since the Romans believed that the gods let their approval or disapproval with proposed actions be known. In addition, a preliminary search for omens (auspices) was conducted by the presiding magistrate the night before any meeting. On several known occasions, presiding magistrates used the claim of unfavorable omens as an excuse to suspend a session that was not going the way they wanted.

On the day of the vote, the electors first assembled into their Conventions for debate and campaigning. In the Conventions, the electors were not sorted into their Curiae. Speeches from private citizens were only heard if the issue to be voted upon was a legislative or judicial matter, and even then, only if the citizen received permission from the presiding magistrate. If the purpose of the ultimate vote was for an election, no speeches from private citizens were heard, and instead, the candidates for office used the Convention to campaign. During the Convention, the bill to be voted upon was read to the assembly by an officer known as a "Herald". Then the order of the vote had to be determined. An urn was brought in, and lots were cast to determine the sequence by which the Curiae were to vote.

The electors were then told to break up the Convention ("depart to your separate groups", or discedite, quirites). The electors assembled behind a fenced off area and voted by placing a pebble or written ballot into an appropriate jar. The baskets (cistae) that held the votes were watched by specific officers (the custodes), who then counted the ballots, and reported the results to the presiding magistrate. The majority of votes in any Curia decided how that Curia voted. If the process was not complete by nightfall, the electors were dismissed without having reached a decision, and the process had to begin again the next day.

Decline
Shortly after the founding of the republic, many of the political powers of the Curiate Assembly were transferred to the Centuriate Assembly and the Tribal Assembly. This included the transfer of the election of tribunes to the Tribal Assembly by the Lex Publilia in 471 BC.

While it then fell into disuse, it did retain some theoretical powers, most importantly, the power to ratify elections of the top-ranking Roman Magistrates (consuls and praetors) by passing a law (lex curiata de imperio or "Curiate law on imperium") that gave them their legal command (imperium) authority. In practice, however, they received this authority from the Centuriate assembly (which formally elected them), and as such, this functioned as nothing more than a reminder of Rome's regal heritage. Even after it lost its powers, the Curiate Assembly continued to be presided over by Consuls and Praetors, and was subject to obstruction by Roman magistrates (especially plebeian tribunes) and unfavorable omens (as were the other assemblies).

By the time of the middle and late Republic, there was considerable debate about the need for confirmation in imperium by the Curiate assembly. For example, praetors were not permitted to undertake judicial business without confirmation in the imperium and nor could consuls command troops or call the comitia centuriata to hold the election of his successor. Cicero's contemporaries argued that without confirmation in the imperium, a magistrate could not as a promagistrate, or without it, govern the province at his own expense and be ineligible for a triumph after a military victory. These rules would have prohibited magistrates from engaging in serious public business before confirmation, but for the fact they were widely ignored and legislation often included provisions stating that in the lack of a curiate law, they "be magistrates in as legal a sense as those who are elected according to the strictest forms of law". By 212 BC, the lack of such a law granting imperium to the propraetor of Spain, Lucius Marcius, was no issue for the senate, which refrained from declaring the election illegal. During the late Republic, by 54, the consul Appius Claudius insisted that he held imperium, due to statute passed by Sulla granting imperium to promagistrates until their return to the city without mention of the curiate grant of imperium, and also that he held the authority to call the Assembly to elect new magistrates. However, in the late Republic, with increasing conflict between the optimates and the populares, it is likely that the senate, trying to increase its control over provincial governors, stressed the importance of this law, even as magistrates ignored their complaints.

Acts that the Curiate Assembly voted on were mostly symbolic and usually in the affirmative. At one point, possibly as early as 218 BC, the Curiate Assembly's thirty Curiae were abolished, and replaced with thirty lictors, one from each of the original Patrician clans.

Since the Curiae had always been organized on the basis of the Roman family, it retained jurisdiction over clan matters even after the fall of the Roman Republic in 27 BC. Under the presidency of the Pontifex Maximus, it witnessed wills and ratified adoptions, inaugurated certain priests, and transfer citizens from Patrician class to Plebeian class (or vice versa). In 59 BC, it transferred Publius Clodius Pulcher from Patrician status to Plebeian status so that he could run for Plebeian Tribune. In 44 BC, it ratified the will of Julius Caesar, and with it Caesar's adoption of his nephew Gaius Octavian (the future Roman Emperor Augustus) as his son and heir.

With the rise of the empire, the sanctioning powers of the Curiate assembly fell into disuse, as the power to grant imperium, along with the vast majority of the other powers of the Curiate assembly, were transferred into the hands of the Senate or delegated to the emperor through a special lex de imperio.

See also

 Roman Kingdom
 Roman Republic
 Roman Empire
 Roman Law
 Plebeian Council
 Centuria
 Curia
 Roman consul
 Praetor
 Roman censor
 Quaestor
 Aedile
 Roman Dictator
 Master of the Horse
 Roman Senate
 Cursus honorum
 Byzantine Senate
 Pontifex Maximus
 Princeps senatus
 Interrex
 Procurator (Roman)
 Acta Senatus

Notes

References

 
 Botsford, George Willis (1909, repr. 2005). The Roman Assemblies. From their Origin to the End of the Republic, New York.
 Byrd, Robert (1995). The Senate of the Roman Republic. U.S. Government Printing Office, Senate Document 103-23.
 Lintott, Andrew (1999). The Constitution of the Roman Republic. Oxford University Press.

 Polybius (1823). The General History of Polybius: Translated from the Greek. By James Hampton. Oxford: Printed by W. Baxter. Fifth Edition, Vol 2.
 Taylor, Lily Ross (1966). Roman Voting Assemblies: From the Hannibalic War to the Dictatorship of Caesar. The University of Michigan Press.
 Tullius Cicero, Marcus (1841 edition). The Political Works of Marcus Tullius Cicero: Comprising his Treatise on the Commonwealth; and his Treatise on the Laws. Translated from the original, with Dissertations and Notes in Two Volumes. By Francis Barham, Esq. London: Edmund Spettigue. Vol. 1.

Further reading

 Ihne, Wilhelm. Researches Into the History of the Roman Constitution. William Pickering. 1853. 
 Johnston, Harold Whetstone. Orations and Letters of Cicero: With Historical Introduction, An Outline of the Roman Constitution, Notes, Vocabulary and Index. Scott, Foresman and Company. 1891.
 Mommsen, Theodor. Roman Constitutional Law. 1871-1888
 Tighe, Ambrose. The Development of the Roman Constitution. D. Apple & Co. 1886.
 Von Fritz, Kurt. The Theory of the Mixed Constitution in Antiquity. Columbia University Press, New York. 1975.
 The Histories by Polybius
 Cambridge Ancient History, Volumes 9–13.
 A. Cameron, The Later Roman Empire, (Fontana Press, 1993).
 M. Crawford, The Roman Republic, (Fontana Press, 1978).
 E. S. Gruen, "The Last Generation of the Roman Republic" (U California Press, 1974)
 F. Millar, The Emperor in the Roman World, (Duckworth, 1977, 1992).
 A. Lintott, "The Constitution of the Roman Republic" (Oxford University Press, 1999)

Primary sources
 Cicero's De Re Publica, Book Two
 Rome at the End of the Punic Wars: An Analysis of the Roman Government; by Polybius

Secondary source material
 Considerations on the Causes of the Greatness of the Romans and their Decline, by Montesquieu
 The Roman Constitution to the Time of Cicero
 What a Terrorist Incident in Ancient Rome Can Teach Us

External links

Government of the Kingdom of Rome
Government of the Roman Republic
Government of the Roman Empire
Roman law
Popular assemblies